Beecher Lake is an unincorporated community located in the town of Beecher, Marinette County, Wisconsin, United States.

References

Unincorporated communities in Marinette County, Wisconsin
Unincorporated communities in Wisconsin